The Sunless City: From the Papers and Diaries of the Late Josiah Flintabbatey Flonatin (or simply The Sunless City) is a dime novel written by J. E. Preston Muddock in 1905. The novel is about a prospector named Josiah Flintabbaty Flonatin who explores a bottomless lake in a submarine, and discovers a land where the norms of society are backwards. The title character is the namesake for the city of Flin Flon, Manitoba, Canada.

Plot
The story centres on the lead character, a prospector named Professor Josiah Flintabbaty Flonatin. Flonatin travels by submarine through a bottomless lake in the Rocky Mountains. While exploring the depths of the lake he discovers a strange city. Within the city the local currency is tin, the streets are paved with gold, and the city is ruled by women. Flonatin, who is a bachelor, decides to escape the city, and does so by climbing out of a crater, which is actually an extinct volcano.

Flin Flon, Manitoba

The Sunless City had been read by Thomas Creighton, a prospector who had been exploring in the area of what would become the town of Flin Flon. In 1915 Creighton and some fellow prospectors discovered mineralization, and Creighton named the discovery "Flin Flon". There are various accounts as to how the discovery (which would become the namesake of the city) was named. In one account an associate of Creighton had brought some gold out of a hole from one of their claims, according to this account Creighton said:

In 1962 a statue designed by Al Capp of Josiah Flintabbatey Flonatin was built in Flin Flon. In 1978, the National Film Board of Canada produced the short documentary Canada Vignettes: Flin Flon about the origin of the city's name.

References

External links 
 

1905 British novels
British science fiction novels
Prospectors
Novels set in Manitoba
Flin Flon